Leonard Alexander (1 September 1921 – 22 July 2012) was an Australian cricketer. He played nine first-class matches for Tasmania between 1946 and 1952.

See also
 List of Tasmanian representative cricketers

References

External links
 

1921 births
2012 deaths
Australian cricketers
Tasmania cricketers
Cricketers from Hobart